Events from the year 1658 in Denmark.

Incumbents
 Monarch – Frederick III
 Steward of the Realm – Joachim Gersdorff

Events

 January 30 – The March across the Belts begins when the harsh winter weather, which has also forced the Danish fleet to port, enables a Swedish army of 9,000 cavalrymen and 3,000 foot soldiers to move across the ice of Little Belt from Jutland to Gunen.
 February 5 – The Swedish King and cavalry cross the Great Belt from Langeland to Lolland and the infantry and the artillery follow the next day.
 February 8 – The Swedish host reaches Zealand.
 February 11 – Having not expected a Swedish offensive until spring at the earliest, Denmark panics and yields. The Treaty of Taastrup is signed as a preliminary accord and negotiations continue.
 February 26
 The negotiations are finalized with the signing of the Treaty of Roskilde in Roskilde. It cedes Scania, Halland, Blekinge and Bornholm as well as two provinces in Norway to Sweden. Even after the treaty enters into force, the Swedish forces continue their campaign.
 After the signing of the treaty, the Danish king hosts a peace banquet at Frederiksborg Castle.
 June 9 – In a letter to the king, citizens of Copenhagen make a demand for special privileges and a City Council of 32 men.
 August 30 – The Royal Life Guards on foot is founded.
 August 10 – As Swedish troops approach Copenhagen once again, the king, in a letter, promises that Copenhagen and Christianshavn will be free  and heard on all matters of national importance, particularly those relating to customs and octroi.
 August 11 – The Swedish army resumes its siege of Copenhagen.
 October 29 – In the Battle of the Sound, a Dutch fleet come in support of Denmark which forces the Swedish fleet to end the blockade of Copenhagen. Soon after, Sweden has to abandon the siege of the city and withdraw from the Danish isles while they remain present in Jutland.
 December 8 – Resistance fighters on Bornholm try to capture the Swedish commander on the island, Redigerer Printzenskiöld, who is killed in the subsequent uproar.
 December 25 – The Battle of Kolding results in Danish-Polish victory against Sweden.

Undated
 Ulstrup Castle is completed.

Births

Deaths
 19 April – Kirsten Munk, noble, royal spouse (born 1598)
 22 July – Frederick, Duke of Schleswig-Holstein-Sønderburg-Norburg (born 1581)
 11 December – Ulrik Christian Gyldenløve, commander-in-chief of the Danish army (born 1630)

References

 
Denmark
Years of the 17th century in Denmark